Pleuropoma is a genus of land snails with an operculum. It is a genus of terrestrial gastropod mollusks in the subfamily Helicininae of the family Helicinidae.

Species
 Pleuropoma albescens (Hartman, 1890)
 Pleuropoma andamanica (Benson, 1860)
 Pleuropoma arakanensis (W. T. Blanford, 1865)
 Pleuropoma articulata (L. Pfeiffer, 1854)
 Pleuropoma brecanrio Stanisic, 2010
 Pleuropoma dichroa (Möllendorff, 1890)
 Pleuropoma draytonensis (Pfeiffer, 1857)
 Pleuropoma dunkeri (Zelebor, 1867)
 Pleuropoma extincta (Odhner, 1917)
 Pleuropoma falcistoma van Benthem Jutting, 1963
 Pleuropoma gilvum van Benthem Jutting, 1963
 Pleuropoma gladstonensis (Cox, 1864)
 Pleuropoma gouldiana (E. Forbes, 1852)
 Pleuropoma jana (Cox, 1872)
 Pleuropoma macleayi (Brazier, 1876)
 Pleuropoma mariae A. J. Wagner, 1911
 Pleuropoma nicobarica (L. Pfeiffer, 1847)
 Pleuropoma nonouensis Neal, 1934
 Pleuropoma pelewensis (Sykes, 1901)
 Pleuropoma queenslandica Stanisic, 2010
 Pleuropoma raiatensis (Garrett, 1884)
 Pleuropoma reflexilabiata Stanisic, 2010
 Pleuropoma richardson Stanisic, 2010
 Pleuropoma rogersi (Bourne, 1911)
 Pleuropoma rotella (G. B. Sowerby II, 1842)
 Pleuropoma scrupula (Benson, 1863)
 Pleuropoma simulans (Garrett, 1884)
 Pleuropoma sophiae (Brazier, 1876)
 Pleuropoma spatei Stanisic, 2010
 Pleuropoma sphaeridium (Möllendorff, 1896)
 Pleuropoma sphaeroconus (Möllendorff, 1895)
 Pleuropoma subrufa (Garrett, 1884)
 Pleuropoma taeniata (Quoy & Gaimard, 1832)
 Pleuropoma talusata Stanisic, 2010
 Pleuropoma varians (Sykes, 1903)
 Pleuropoma vicina A. J. Wagner, 1911
 Pleuropoma walkeri (E. A. Smith, 1894)
Synonyms
 Pleuropoma aruana (L. Pfeiffer, 1859): synonym of Aphanoconia aruana (L. Pfeiffer, 1859)
 Pleuropoma calamianica (Möllendorff, 1898): synonym of Aphanoconia trichroa calamianica (Möllendorff, 1898) (chresonym)
 Pleuropoma chichijimanum Kuroda, 1956: synonym of Ogasawarana chichijimana (Kuroda, 1956) (original combination)
 Pleuropoma laciniosa (Mighels, 1845): synonym of Sturanya laciniosa (Mighels, 1945)
 Pleuropoma maugeriae (Gray, 1824): synonym of Orobophana maugeriae (Gray, 1824) (new combination)
 Pleuropoma mediana (Gassies, 1870): synonym of Sturanya mediana (Gassies, 1870)
 Pleuropoma metamorpha Kuroda, 1956: synonym of Ogasawarana metamorpha (Kuroda, 1956) (original combination)
 Pleuropoma primeana (Gassies, 1863): synonym of Sturanya sphaeroidea (L. Pfeiffer, 1855) (synonym)
 Pleuropoma subsculpta Neal, 1934: synonym of Sturanya subsculpta (Neal, 1934) (new combination)
 Pleuropoma sublaevigata (L. Pfeiffer, 1852): synonym of Sturanya sublaevigata (L. Pfeiffer, 1852)
 Pleuropoma togatula (Morelet, 1857): synonym of Sturanya macgillivrayi (L. Pfeiffer, 1855) (junior synonym)
 Pleuropoma yorkensis (L. Pfeiffer, 1863) (uncertain > nomen dubium)

References

Vol. III. Trochomorphidae and systematical review of all other families. Ancona: L'Informatore Piceno. 160 pp
 Bank, R. A. (2017). Classification of the Recent terrestrial Gastropoda of the World. Last update: July 16th, 2017

External links
 Möllendorff, O. F. von. (1893). Materialien zur Fauna der Philippinen. XI. Die Insel Leyte. Bericht der Senckenbergischen Naturforschenden Gesellschaft. 1892/1893: 51-154

Helicinidae
Gastropod genera